Diego García de Paredes (1466–1534), Spanish soldier and duellist, was a native of Trujillo in Extremadura, Spain.

Biography 
He never commanded an army or rose to the position of a general, but he was a notable figure in the wars of the end of the 15th and beginning of the 16th century, when personal prowess had still a considerable share in deciding combat. His native town and its district, which lie between Badajoz and Madrid, produced many of the most noted conquistadores of America, including the Pizarro family.

Diego himself served in his youth in the Granada War. His strength, daring, and activity fitted him to shine in operations largely composed of night marches, escalades, surprises and hand-to-hand combat. The main scene of his achievements was Italy, and he betook himself to it—on his own showing—not in search of glory, but because he had killed a relation of his own, Ruy Sanchez de Vargas, in a street fight arising out of a quarrel about a horse. He fled to Rome, then under the rule of the Borgias.

Diego was a distant relation to the cardinal (Bernardino López de Carvajal), a favorite of Pope Alexander VI, who was in conflict with the barons of the Romagna and took Diego into his service. He remained a soldier of the pope until he killed a man in a personal quarrel and found it necessary to pass over to the enemy. He then became acquainted with the Colonnas, who appreciated his services. The wars between Ferdinand V of Castilla (the Catholic king) and Louis XII gave him a more creditable opening.

The Spanish general Gonzalo de Córdoba employed him and trusted him: and he took part in the wars of Italy, on the frontier of Navarre, and once against the Turks on the Danube, till 1530. He died in Bologna in 1534 by a fall while engaged in a horse jumping-match with some of the younger officers of the army. His body was carried to his native town Trujillo, and buried in the church of Santa María la Mayor in 1545.

In the Brief Summary of his life and deeds attributed to him, and printed at the end of the Chronicle of the Great Captain, published in 1584 at Alcalá de Henares, he lays no claim to having done more than was open to a very athletic man.

In Don Quixote, the curate holds Diego up as an example of a real hero about whom one should read rather than about the lies in the tales of chivalry (Part I Chapter XXXII).

He had a son, also named Diego García de Paredes, who became a Conquistador and founded several cities in Venezuela.

References

1466 births
1534 deaths
People from Tierra de Trujillo
Spanish soldiers
Spanish duellists
Deaths by horse-riding accident in Italy
Spanish military officers